Jholaishal Union is a union parishad situated at Boda Upazila,  in Panchagarh District, Rangpur Division of Bangladesh. There are 20 villages and 17 mouzas in the union.

References

External links
 

Unions of Boda Upazila
Unions of Panchagarh District
Unions of Rangpur Division